Beats Per Minute (formerly One Thirty BPM) is a New York City– and Los Angeles–based online publication providing reviews, news, media, interviews and feature articles about the music world. Beats Per Minute covers a variety of genres and specializes in rock, hip hop, and electronic music.

History 
Founded in late 2008 as a five-man operation. It was named as a reference to Of Montreal song 'Suffer for Fashion'. As of 2011, Beats Per Minute had expanded to a staff of about 50 contributors based in the U.S., U.K., New Zealand, Germany, Australia, and Sweden.

The site changed its name from 'One Thirty BPM' to 'Beats Per Minute' in January 2012.

Ratings 
It issues music ratings on a 0–100% point scale. As of May 7, 2022, Beats Per Minute music scores were described by Metacritic as typically (59% of the time) higher than most other critic scores. Metacritic reported that out of 1406 music scores given by the website, the site gave positive reviews to 1276 of them and gave negative reviews to only 18 of them (1% of the total number of scores given).

References

External links
Official Website

Companies based in New York City
Music review websites
Online music magazines published in the United States
Magazines established in 2008
Magazines published in New York City